Pawni Pandey is an Indian singer who was a contestant on Sa Re Ga Ma Pa L'il Champs and advanced to fifth place with public votes. She made her debut in the singing reality show Indian Idol. Post the reality show, she has sung a diverse number of songs in Bollywood films and is a live performer in both national and international shows.

She became more well known after her song "Laila Main Laila" from Raees became hit. She received significant amount of Indian media coverage due to her much acclaimed singing of the song.
She then became a part of the Grand Jury for the singing reality show Sa Re Ga Ma Pa Lil Champs 2017.

Early life and career
Pandey started singing from the age of 3 and at the age of 9 her parents recognised her talent and at the age of 10, her family migrated from Jaipur to Mumbai so that Pawni can pursue music seriously and get better opportunities. After moving to Mumbai, she participated in the "Sa Re Ga Ma Pa Lil Champs" where she was adjudged as the "Best Female Singer". However the music directors insisted her to give herself more time and get trained well as she was too young to make a career as a singer in Hindi cinema.
She then got formally trained in Indian classical music, and received special training in western music from vocal dynamics trainer Thomas Appell from Los Angeles.

Her first major breakthrough came when she sung for the 2011 film Bodyguard. However, according to her, the singing career progressed slowly.

Pandey considers Lata Mangeshkar as an inspiration, among the current generation of musicians her favourites are Amaal Mallik, Sachin–Jigar and Arijit Singh.

Discography

References

External links
Pawni's SifyMax Microsite

Sa Re Ga Ma Pa participants
Living people
Singers from Mumbai
Indian women playback singers
Indian women pop singers
Musicians from Jaipur
Women musicians from Rajasthan
21st-century Indian women singers
21st-century Indian singers
Indian folk-pop singers
Year of birth missing (living people)